Winterset is a 1936 American crime film directed by Alfred Santell, based on the 1935 play of the same name by Maxwell Anderson, in a loose dramatization of the Sacco and Vanzetti trial and execution in 1928. The script retains elements of the blank verse poetic meter on which Anderson based his 1935 Winterset Broadway theater production.

Actor Burgess Meredith made his credited film debut as the avenging son Rio Romagna.

The film greatly changes the ending of the play, in which the lovers Mio and Miriamne are shot to death by gangsters. In the film, the two are cornered, but Mio deliberately causes a commotion by loudly playing a nearby abandoned hurdy-gurdy and deliberately causing himself and Miriamne to be arrested, thus placing them out of reach from the gangsters. The film made a loss of $2,000.

Cast
 Burgess Meredith as Mio Romagna
 Margo as Miriamne Esdras
 Eduardo Ciannelli as Trock Estrella
 Maurice Moscovitch as Esdras
 Paul Guilfoyle as Garth Esdras
 Edward Ellis as Judge Gaunt
 Stanley Ridges as Shadow
 Mischa Auer as A radical
 Willard Robertson as Policeman
 Alec Craig as Oak
 John Carradine as Bartolomeo Romagna
 Myron McCormick as Carr
 Helen Jerome Eddy as Maria Romagna
 Barbara Pepper as A girl
 Fernanda Eliscu as Piny

Reception
Writing for The Spectator in 1937, Graham Greene gave the film a good review, noting that "this play (in the original it was in blank verse) has [...] solid merits". Despite its genre, Greene commented that "there are situations [...] which have more intensity than mere 'thriller' stuff". He praised the "evil magnificence" of Ciannelli's acting as Trock, pointing out that "here, as in all good plays, it is in the acts themselves, as much as in the dialogue, that the poetic idea is expressed."

Awards
The film was nominated for two Academy Awards, one for Best Art Direction by Perry Ferguson and the other for Original Score by Nathaniel Shilkret.

Footnotes

References
Ross, Donna. Winterset, 1936. UCLA Film and Television Archive: 12th Festival of Preservation, July 22-August 21, 2004. Festival guest handbook.

External links

 
 
 

1936 films
1936 crime drama films
American black-and-white films
American crime drama films
American gangster films
American films based on plays
1930s English-language films
Films about capital punishment
Films about miscarriage of justice
Films directed by Alfred Santell
Films set in 1920
Films set in 1936
Films set in New York (state)
Films scored by Nathaniel Shilkret
RKO Pictures films
Works about Sacco and Vanzetti
1930s American films